Mapusa Municipal Market (also known as Mapusa Market and Mapusa Friday Market)  is a traditional market in Mapusa, North Goa and a major tourist attraction. It was built in 1960, the first planned market in Goa. The market has three blocks with 164 shops, some of which have been sub-divided, so bringing the total to 173. It is open every day, except Sunday; and is particularly popular on Friday mornings.

The trade 

Goan vendors come in from the surrounding villages to sell their locally grown or manufactured wares, such as spices, fruits, jewellery, pottery, chickens, incense and carpets. Many of the stalls in the bazaar are grouped by type of goods, with special areas for straw hats, Goan home-made chouriço and the like. Strings of Goan chouriço, spiced and marinated pork sausages, seedless tamarind, or amot are also traded.

Gallery

References

External links 

 Detailed Map of shops in Mapusa Market

Retail markets in India
Bazaars in India
Economy of Goa
Tourist attractions in North Goa district
Buildings and structures in Mapusa
Mapusa